Ain't Life Grand is the fourth studio album by the Athens, GA-based band Widespread Panic. It was released by Capricorn Records and Warner Bros. Records on September 6, 1994. It was re-released in 2001 by Zomba Music Group. On July 3, 2014, the band announced that Ain't Life Grand would be reissued on vinyl in August 2014.

The band got minor airplay for their cover of Bloodkin's "Can't Get High," as well as their own "Airplane." They performed the song '"Ain't Life Grand'" at Morehouse College for Good Morning America.

The band began rehearsing for the album by recording pre-recording sessions at John Keane's home studio like their first album, Space Wrangler. They were so pleased with the results that they decided to use the sessions for Ain't Life Grand instead of going into the studio on a future date with their producer Johnny Sandlin.

The album peaked at No. 84 on the Billboard 200.

Critical reception
Trouser Press wrote that "although the chorus comes straight from the Bon Jovi cliché book, 'Heroes' musters a milder version of Pearl Jam’s taut emotional ambience."

Track listing
All songs by Widespread Panic except where otherwise noted.
"Little Kin" – 5:04
"Ain't Life Grand" – 4:48
"Airplane" – 4:11
"Can't Get High" (Carter, Hutchens) – 3:49
"Heroes" – 5:06
"Raise the Roof" – 4:44
"Junior" (Junior Kimbrough, Spring) – 4:34
"L.A." – 4:12
"Blackout Blues" – 5:17
"Jack" – 7:06
"Fishwater" – 6:10
Hidden Track "Waiting for the Wind to Blow Down the Tree in My Back Yard" – 1:47

Personnel
Widespread Panic
John Bell – guitar, mandolin, vocals
John Hermann - keyboards, vocals
Michael Houser – guitar, vocals
Todd Nance – drums, vocals
Domingo S. Ortiz – percussion
Dave Schools – bass guitar

Guest performers
David Blackmon – fiddle
Eric Carter – vocals
Adriene Fishe – vocals
John Keane – guitar, pedal steel, vocals
Dwight Manning – oboe

Production
David Barbe – assistant engineering
Marcia Beverley – art direction
Caram Costanzo	 – mixing
Jackie Jasper – photography
John Keane – production, engineering, mixing
James Mitchell (Michalopoulos) – artwork
Clif Norrell – mixing
Benny Quinn – mastering

References

External links
Widespread Panic website
Everyday Companion
PanicStream

1994 albums
Capricorn Records albums
Widespread Panic albums
Albums produced by John Keane (record producer)